The 2007 Holy Cross Crusaders football team was an American football team that represented the College of the Holy Cross during the 2007 NCAA Division I FCS football season. Holy Cross tied for second in the Patriot League.

In their fourth year under head coach Tom Gilmore, the Crusaders compiled a 7–4 record. Casey Gough, Obi Green and Dominic Randolph were the team captains.

The Crusaders outscored opponents 395 to 264. Holy Cross' 4–2 conference record tied with Colgate and Lafayette for second place out of seven in the Patriot League standings. 

Holy Cross played its home games at Fitton Field on the college campus in Worcester, Massachusetts.

Schedule

References

Holy Cross
Holy Cross Crusaders football seasons
Holy Cross Crusaders football